Luis Arístides Fiallo Cabral (8 May 1876 – 20 March 1931 in Santo Domingo) was an astronomer, medical laboratory scientist, physician, lawyer, architect, writer, philosopher and politician from the Dominican Republic.

Biography

Born on 8 May 1876, his parents were Juan Ramón Rodríguez Fiallo and Ana María Cabral y Figueredo—a sister of Marcos Antonio Cabral y Figueredo. He was brother of poet Fabio Fiallo, uncle of both fashion designer Oscar de la Renta and physician and political activist Viriato Fiallo, grandnephew of President José María Cabral y Luna, first-cousin once-removed of Larimar Fiallo (Miss Dominican Republic 2004), and both great-great-grandfather and 1st cousin-thrice removed of film director José María Cabral González.

He married on 27 December 1900 to Flor de María Gregoria Henríquez García (1879–1963), the daughter of poet Federico Henríquez y Carvajal (1848–1952) and Carmen Amalia García Ricardo (1856–1894); his wife was niece of President Francisco Henríquez y Carvajal and cousin of Camila and Pedro Henríquez Ureña. They had 7 children: Fior d’Aliza, Gracia Leda, Hostos (1903–1988), Isis, Telma (d. 1998), Urania (b. 1911), Safo Suleika (1915–2001).

Fiallo received every degree the University of Santo Domingo could offer.

Fiallo Cabral was member of the Académie des sciences et lettres de Montpellier and the Société Française de Dermatologie. Fiallo was deputy for the Dominican Republic Congress, Dean of the Faculty of Medicine of the University of Santo Domingo, and President of the Dominican Society of Geography. He was the author of the Theory of Biocosmic Universal Gravitation.

Fiallo died on 20 March 1931 in Santo Domingo. The Dominican government declared five days of national mourning.

References

Place of birth missing
Dominican Republic people of Canarian descent
Dominican Republic people of Portuguese descent
Dominican Republic scientists
1876 births
1931 deaths
White Dominicans